Give the Drummer Some is the debut solo studio album by American drummer Travis Barker. Barker had earlier announced that the album would be slated for a September 14, 2010 release, but was later pushed back, with the album being released on March 15, 2011. The album, released under Interscope Records, was produced by the drummer himself, alongside The Neptunes, RZA, Kool Kojak, Chuck Inglish, Transplants, Kid Cudi, edIT, Corey Taylor and Steve Aoki. The album debuted at number nine on the US Billboard 200 chart, with first-week sales of 28,000 copies in the United States.

Background
The album title itself is a reference to a track by the Ultramagnetic MC's of the same name, which in turn derives from James Brown's "Funky Drummer." The album cover was created by Pushead. It was first announced by Barker himself that the album would be of "no one genre," indicating that the album wouldn't be based on hip hop or punk rock, unlike his previous remixes and collaborations. However, most of the tracks are hip hop and R&B influenced, though for instance "Misfits" has a techno and dance sound and "On My Own" has a metal groove to it. Guests that collaborated and are featured are: Slaughterhouse, The Cool Kids, RZA, Ludacris, Lil Wayne, Rick Ross, Game, Raekwon, Tom Morello, Slash, Steve Aoki, Busta Rhymes, Lil Jon, Pharrell, Tech N9ne, Cypress Hill, Twista, Jay Rock, Kobe, Paul Wall, Clipse, Kid Cudi, Yelawolf, Snoop Dogg, Lupe Fiasco, Swizz Beatz, and Bun B. Barker confirmed in an interview that there will not be any collaborations with Mark Hoppus and Tom Delonge from Blink-182 as he thought it would be wrong to have the first new Blink-182 song on his album, and that the song will be released separately as a single before the album is released in June–July 2011. The track listing was revealed on February 25, 2011.

Promotion
The first music video released from the album was for the song "Jump Down" featuring The Cool Kids. It was directed by Nichole Ehrlich and Chris Young, and premiered on October 14, 2010, on YouTube in both normal and 3D versions. The second music video "Carry It" featuring Raekwon, RZA and Tom Morello premiered on November 2, 2010. The first official single from the album, "Could a Drummer Get Some" featuring Lil Wayne, Rick Ross, Swizz Beatz and Game, was released on February 1, 2011, though it leaked a few days earlier. Barker had performed the song live along with Game, Swizz Beatz and Mix Master Mike on Jimmy Kimmel Live! on February 10, 2011. Barker had performed the song "Saturday Night" live with Transplants, Mix Master Mike, Elvis Cortez of Left Alone and Kevin Bivona of Telacasters, on Conan on March 7, 2011. Music videos have been released for "Jump Down", "Carry It", "Could a Drummer Get Some" , "Misfits", "Saturday Night", "Let's Go", and most recently "Just Chill".

Track listing
Confirmed by Amazon.com.

On the clean version "Raw Shit" is labeled "Raw ****".

Charts

Personnel
In alphabetical order

Steve Aoki – vocals, producer
Tim Armstrong – vocals, guitar, producer
Alabama Barker – vocals
Landon Barker – vocals
Travis Barker – bass, composer, creative director, drum programming, drums, percussions, keyboard, programming, producer
B-Real – vocals
DJ Marshall Barnes – turntables
Beanie Sigel – vocals
Kevin Bivona – bass, engineer, guitar, keyboards
Dee Brown – assistant
Joe Budden – vocals
Bun B – vocals
Andrew Coleman – engineer
Crooked I – vocals
Dev – vocals
DJ Spider – turntables
E-40 – vocals
Edit – producer, programming
Brian "Big Bass" Gardner – mastering
Game – vocals
George Gumbs – assistant, mixing assistant
Graham Stan Hargrove – assistant
Ryan Hunter – photography
Chuck Inglish – vocals, producer
James Ingram – assistant, bass, editing, guitar mixing, studio manager
Jay Rock – vocals
Jaysonsucks – photography
Kev-E-Kev – turntables
Kobe – vocals
Kurupt – vocals
Kid Cudi – vocals, guitar, producer
Kool Kojak – producer
Lil Jon – vocals
Lil Wayne – vocals
Ludacris – vocals
Lupe Fiasco – vocals
Maxx242 – art direction
Joshua Monroy – engineer
Tom Morello – composer, guitar
Neal H Pogue – mixing
Jeremiah Olvera – assistant, mixing assistant
Joell Ortiz – vocals
P-Mo – assistant
Dawaun Parker – keyboards
Paul Wall – vocals
Pushead – cover art
Raekwon – vocals
Rick Ross – vocals
Royce da 5'9" – vocals
Mikey Rocks – vocals
RZA – vocals, guitar, producer
Sen Dog – vocals
Skinhead Rob – vocals, producer
Slash – guitar solo
Snoop Dogg – vocals
Swizz Beatz – vocals
Corey Taylor – vocals, guitar, producer
Tech N9ne – vocals
Twista – vocals
Pharrell Williams – vocals, producer
Yelawolf – vocals

References

2011 debut albums
Travis Barker albums
Albums produced by Travis Barker
Albums produced by DJ Khalil
Albums produced by the Neptunes
Albums produced by Swizz Beatz
Albums produced by RZA
Albums produced by Chuck Inglish
Albums produced by Kid Cudi
Albums with cover art by Pushead